Srivari Muchatlu is a 1981 Telugu-language drama film, produced by N. R. Anuradha Devi under the Lakshmi Films Combines banner and directed by Dasari Narayana Rao. The film stars Akkineni Nageswara Rao, Jaya Prada, Jayasudha  and music composed by Chakravarthy. The film is remade as Hindi Movie Asha Jyoti (1984).

Plot
Gopi a musician son of a rich businessman Chakrapani who falls in love with a beautiful girl Radha at Kashmir. But Chakrapani insists him to marry his maternal uncle's daughter Priya which he keeps declining. Here Gopi affirms his decision to his parents and also promises to pay off the debts owed by Radha's father. At that point in time, Chakrapani commits suicide due to bankruptcy when Gopi's uncle bails him out, circumstances make Gopi delay and unable to return to Radha. In Kashmir, the Radha creditor threatens them when Gopi arrives and makes her father lie that Radha is married off to the creditor. Heartbroken Gopi returns home when his mother suggests him to settle in life, so, he marries Priya to show his gratitude towards his uncle. During the wedding, Gopi notices Radha along with his child when he learns the truth. Now Gopi decides takes care of his both wives without giving knowledge to each other. Later, Radha becomes a popular dance teacher, Priya also gives birth to a baby who decides to learn dance from Radha when they become best friends. After some time, Priya observers closeness of Radha and Gopi, though, in the beginning, she suspects, afterward, understand the reality and victims the unpredictable nature of fate. Finally, both Radha and Priya sacrifice their respective lives to let the other live a nice happy married life with Gopi.

Cast
Akkineni Nageswara Rao as Gopi
Jaya Prada as Radha
Jayasudha as Priya
Prabhakar Reddy as Chakrapani
Allu Ramalingaiah 
K. V. Chalam
P. J. Sarma
Hari Prasad
Rajasulochana
Sukumari
Kavitha
Nirmalamma

Soundtrack

Music composed by Chakravarthy. Lyrics were written by Dasari Narayana Rao.  Music released on AVM Audio Company.

References

External links

Indian drama films
Films directed by Dasari Narayana Rao
Films scored by K. Chakravarthy
Telugu films remade in other languages